Trochus kotschyi, common name the Kotschy's gibbula, is a species of sea snail, a marine gastropod mollusk in the subfamily Trochinae of the family Trochidae, the top snails.

Description
The size of the shell varies between 18 mm and 30 mm. The narrowly perforated shell has a conoidal shape. It is whitish-ashen, ornamented with undulating, oblique, radiating chestnut or blackish stripes. The spire is acute. The shell contains 7 whorls. The first whorl is eroded, the remainder are angulated and nodulose above. Above the carina the shell is obliquely nodulose, below the carina spirally lirate with 4 lirae. The body whorl is biangular, convex beneath, and has 7 concentric brown-spotted lirae. The aperture is subquadrate. The white columella is arcuate, sinuous, and below strongly truncate-dentate.

Distribution
This species occurs in the Persian Gulf and in the northwest Indian Ocean.

References

 Herbert D.G. (1994). Trochus kotschyi, the first Indian Ocean record of the genus Osilinus (Mollusca: Gastropoda: Trochidae). Journal of Zoology 233:345-357

External links
 To World Register of Marine Species
  Philippi, R. A. (1846-1855). Die Kreiselschnecken oder Trochoideen (Gattungen Turbo, Trochus, Solarium, Rotella, Delphinula, Phasianella). In Abbildungen nach der Natur mit Beschreibungen. In: Küster, H. C.; Ed. Systematisches Conchylien Cabinet von Martini und Chemnitz. Zweiten Bandes, dritte Abtheilung. 2(3): 1-372, pl. 1-49. Nürnberg: Bauer & Raspe
 Uribe J.E., Williams S.T., Templado J., Buge B. & Zardoya R. (2017). Phylogenetic relationships of Mediterranean and North-East Atlantic Cantharidinae and notes on Stomatellinae (Vetigastropoda: Trochidae). Molecular Phylogenetics and Evolution. 107: 64–79

kotschyi
Gastropods described in 1849
Taxa named by Rodolfo Amando Philippi